David Leonard Gilliland (born April 1, 1976) is an American professional stock car racing driver and team owner. Since 2017, he has operated David Gilliland Racing, a team that races in the NASCAR Camping World Truck Series, ARCA Menards Series, and CARS Tour.

Formerly a full-time competitor for a decade in the NASCAR Cup Series, he is now semi-retired and competes part-time in the Truck Series (in the No. 17 Ford F-150) and the ARCA Menards Series East and West, driving for his team. Born in Riverside, California, he is the son of former NASCAR Cup and West Series driver Butch Gilliland, and the father of current full-time Cup Series driver Todd Gilliland.

After competing full-time in the West Series like his father, Gilliland ran part-time in what is now the NASCAR Xfinity Series in 2006, and scored a win at Kentucky Speedway, which is considered one of the biggest upsets in NASCAR history. In his first full season in the Cup Series, Gilliland would win the pole for the 2007 Daytona 500.

Racing career

NASCAR

Regional series
In 1996, he began working on his father's Winston West Series team. By 1999, Gilliland won the track championship at Perris Auto Speedway (a dirt track). Then, the following year he began a limited season in the AutoZone West Series. In 2003, Gilliland won five races in the NASCAR AutoZone Elite Division, Southwest Series, in the No. 11 Centrifugal Technologies-sponsored Chevrolet. He finished the season with five Top 5's and eight Top 10's and a sixth-place finish in points.

In 2004, Gilliland announced plans to run the full schedule in the NASCAR AutoZone Elite Division, Southwest Series, in the No. 88 Chevrolet for MRG Motorsports and all non-conflicting NASCAR Grand National Division, West Series (now AutoZone West), races. He got his first AutoZone West win at Mesa Marin Raceway. He was then named NASCAR Grand National Division, West Series Rookie of the Year. He also had two victories in the NASCAR AutoZone Elite Division, Southwest Series.

National series
Gilliland made his first attempt at a major NASCAR race in 2003, at the Las Vegas 350 in the Craftsman Truck Series, but failed to qualify. He announced that Clay Andrews Racing would form in mid-2005. Gilliland made his Busch Series debut at Phoenix, qualifying 28th. However, he was involved with an early crash and finished 43rd. Gilliland made the other Phoenix race later in the year but had the same result. He was 43rd after ignition troubles. Also, he ran the No. 15 Billy Ballew Motorsports Chevy at Las Vegas Motor Speedway in the Craftsman Truck Series with a 22nd-place finish.

Meanwhile, Gilliland raced in the Grand National Division in 2005 and won the Toyota All-Star Showdown in 2005 when apparent winner Mike Olsen was disqualified for light wheels wider than regulation. The win brought Gilliland to the attention of Busch and Cup series team owners.

Gilliland began running the No. 84 Clay Andrews Chevy part-time in 2006, during which time he was mentored by former Sprint Cup race winner Jerry Nadeau. Gilliland, however, struggled to finish races, earning a best result of 29th in his first four starts of the year. However, in his next outing, Gilliland scored his first career Busch Series win at Kentucky on June 17. Gilliland drove the No. 84 Hype Manufacturing Chevrolet to victory, becoming the first driver of 2006 to win a Busch race who was not also running a full-time Nextel Cup schedule. FX television announcer Hermie Sadler called the victory "the biggest upset in Busch Series history".

Cup Series

Gilliland made his first attempt to make a Cup race in June 2006 at Infineon Raceway in Sonoma, California, in the No. 72 Dutch Quality Stone-sponsored Chevy for CJM Racing, qualifying 31st, and finishing 32nd. In August 2006, Gilliland replaced Elliott Sadler as the driver of the M&Ms/Mars-sponsored No. 38 Ford in the NEXTEL Cup Series for Yates Racing. On October 7, he qualified on the pole for the UAW Ford 500 at Talladega Superspeedway, the first pole of his career in the Cup Series.

Gilliland went full-time in the Number 38 car in 2007 with M&M's and Mars returning as sponsors. However, Mars decided before the 2007 season to move its 2008 sponsorship to teammate Ricky Rudd’s 2007 ride at Yates, in preparation for moving to Kyle Busch in 2008. This meant Gilliland needed to impress in 2007 to attract a sponsor for the No. 38.

Gilliland started the season with a bang, winning his second career pole at the 2007 Daytona 500, his first points-paying race at the track. In the race itself, Gilliland finished eighth. Gilliland also drove part-time in the Busch Series for Team Rensi Motorsports with sponsorship from FreeCreditReport.com in 2007, splitting the driving duties at Rensi with rookie Richard Johns. His best finish in Busch was a tenth at Daytona.

As Gordon had the points lead at the time of the race, Gilliland started the race in second, giving the pole to Gordon. Gilliland finished 28th in the Cup standings in 2007, recording two top-10s in his rookie season.

In 2008, Gilliland’s Busch Series sponsor FreeCreditReport.com, and Yates’ Busch Series sponsor Citi Financial became the new sponsors of the No. 38 Cup car. He also ran three Nationwide Series races, one for Travis Carter and Carl Haas, and two for Mike Curb and Gary Baker. Gilliland recorded a career-best second-place finish in Cup at Sonoma Raceway. Kyle Busch won the race with Gilliland's old sponsor, M&M's, as Gilliland finished runner-up in his FreeCreditReport.com-sponsored Ford. At Texas in the fall, Gilliland was penalized by NASCAR for wrecking Juan Pablo Montoya. Gilliland again had two Top 10 finishes in 2008, improving slightly to 27th in points.

In January 2009, his No. 38 Sprint Cup team was closed due to a lack of sponsorship, and his points from 2008 were moved to the Hall of Fame Racing team of Bobby Labonte.

After sitting out the 2009 Daytona 500 without a ride, he was hired by TRG Motorsports for the rest of the 2009 season to drive the No. 71 Chevrolet, with sponsorships from TaxSlayer, Capital Window, and American Monster. However, the season proved tough as TRG was short on funding by May, forcing Gilliland to start and park on several occasions. In August, Gilliland failed to qualify a second TRG car, the No. 70, at Watkins Glen. By September Labonte was now part-time at Hall of Fame and it was announced he would bring much-needed funding to TRG in seven of the final 12 races, replacing Gilliland who would not have been able to run full races. Gilliland did run the other five races for TRG in the No. 71 with limited funding.

Gilliland then landed a 3-race deal to drive a new part-time fourth Joe Gibbs Racing car, the No. 02 Farm Bureau Insurance-sponsored Toyota.

In addition to his part-time rides at the No. 02 and the No. 71, in the second half of 2009 Gilliland also ran one race each in Cup for the Wood Brothers, in the iconic No. 21 Ford, for Robby Gordon in his No. 7 Toyota, and for Phoenix Racing in the No. 09 Chevy, also running several Nationwide Series races for Phoenix. Gilliland also failed to qualify a Gordon-owned No. 04 Toyota at Kansas. At California in October, Gilliland relieved a sick Kyle Busch after parking the TRG car.

Gilliland managed to attempt all but two races in 2009 (the 500 and the fall Loudon race), salvaging 37th in points despite running for so many different teams. His best finish was a 14th at Las Vegas in the No. 71, with a 19th place at Atlanta in the Wood Brothers No. 21 being his second-best run of 2009.

In 2010, Gilliland began the season with BAM Racing in the No. 49 after the team took the 2009 season off. However, the team failed to qualify for the Daytona 500 and shut down for good. Left without a ride, Gilliland ended up attempting every remaining race in one of Front Row Motorsports’ three Fords, either the No. 34, the No. 37, or the No. 38; missing the show at Indy in the No. 38.  He was sponsored by Taco Bell in most races. Gilliland's best finishes in 2010 came at Martinsville and Sonoma, a 19th at both tracks. After having his initial ride shut down for the second straight season, Gilliland again scrambled to finish 32nd in points.

In 2011, Gilliland began driving FRM's No. 34 Taco Bell-sponsored Ford full-time. He finished third in the 2011 Daytona 500, the team's best finish in a race to that point, and Gilliland's second-best finish in Cup. Gilliland recorded two Top 10 finishes in 2011 and ended up 30th in Cup points.

For 2012, Gilliland moved to the team's No. 38 car. Gilliland's primary sponsor was Long John Silvers, and his team later received a multi-race sponsorship from Modspace for the 2012 season. Gilliland nearly finished 3rd in the Daytona 500 for the second straight year, but a late red flag was lifted and Gilliland was shuffled back to 23rd. Gilliland had a best finish of 13th and wound up 30th in the standing for a second consecutive year.

In 2013, Gilliland returned to the No. 38 Ford, with Love's Travel Stops coming on board to join Long John Silvers on the car. At the spring Talladega race, Gilliland pushed FRM teammate David Ragan to victory in a green-white-checkered finish that saw Gilliland tie his career-best finish of second, giving FRM a one-two finish in the race, the first in team history Gilliland recorded two Top 10 finishes in 2013, finishing 26th in points, the best Cup points finish of Gilliland's career.

Gilliland returned once again to the No. 38 in 2014, with Love's now as the primary sponsor on his Ford. Gilliland won the pole for the 2014 Coke Zero 400, with a lap speed of  his first pole since 2007 after he won the first round of qualifying and rain prevented further rounds. It was the first pole for the Front Row Motorsports team. However, Gilliland did retreat to 30th in points once again.

Gilliland was back in the No.38 Love's-sponsored Ford in 2015. He also returned to the Truck Series for a part-time schedule in the No.92 Ricky Benton Racing Ford, where he recorded two Top 10s. In the Cup Series, Gilliland finished 11th at the season-opening Daytona 500. His second-best finish was an 18th place at Bristol, and Gilliland finished 32nd in driver points. 2015 would turn out to be Gilliland's final full season in NASCAR.

Gilliland was replaced by Landon Cassill in 2016, but returned to FRM for the Daytona 500 in the No. 35. However, he failed to qualify for the race. Though the 500 was only supposed to be a one race deal, Gilliland and Front Row announced plans to run at Talladega in April. Gilliland qualified the race beating Josh Wise, and finished 17th after running in the Top 3 in the final two laps. The two starts in the No. 35 were Gilliland's only appearances in the 2016 Cup season.

In 2017, Gilliland did not race in Cup or any NASCAR series for that matter.

On January 17, 2018, it was announced that Gilliland joined Ricky Benton Racing to attempt the Daytona 500 in the No. 92 CarQuest Auto Parts-sponsored Ford Fusion. Gilliland, who had run for RBR in the Truck Series in 2015, had to go to a backup car for the 500 after wrecking out of the Duel race. However, Gilliland's attention in 2018 mostly went to the Camping World Truck Series, where Gilliland is an owner and driver.

Post-Cup career
Gilliland returned to the Camping World Truck Series in 2018, participating in the NextEra Energy Resources 250 at Daytona as a substitute driver for his son Todd. Under NASCAR regulations, Todd Gilliland was ineligible to participate at any track larger than 1.25 miles until May 15, 2018 (his 18th birthday), and team owner Kyle Busch asked David to drive for his son in one of the four races where he was ineligible in 2018. Gilliland also became a team owner in the Truck Series, partnering with Bo LeMastus to buy the assets of Red Horse Racing, with which the team DGR-Crosley was formed. Gilliland ran a partial schedule in the team's No. 54 entry, running near the front of the field. In 2019, he drove DGR-Crosley's No. 17 at Daytona and again at Martinsville Speedway in March.

DGR-Crosley reverted to the David Gilliland Racing name in 2021 as Johnny Gray took over as co-owner. On February 5, 2021, it was announced that Gilliland would return to the Truck Series to drive for his team again in the season-opener at Daytona. He attempted to qualify for the race in the team's part-time No. 17 truck. On September 21, Gilliland was suspended for one race, fined 1,500 and placed on probation by ARCA for the remainder of the 2021 season for non-compliant activities on pit road at the Bristol race. During the race, Drew Dollar spun DGR driver Thad Moffitt, resulting in a fight between Gilliland and Dollar on pit road.

Personal life
Gilliland was a high school golf teammate of Tiger Woods at Western High School in Anaheim.

He is married to his wife Michelle and the couple has two children, Todd and Taylor. Todd, a two-time consecutive champion in what is now the ARCA Menards Series West, currently competes full-time in the Cup Series in the No. 38 Ford Mustang for Front Row Motorsports, which has an alliance with DGR, his family team.

His son Todd has a racing career and on May 17, 2015, became the youngest winner in the history of ARCA at age 15 and 2 days with a win at Toledo Speedway.  Todd followed it up with a win at the K&N Pro Series West race at Phoenix International Raceway, making three generations of the Gilliland family to have won in the series.

Motorsports career results

NASCAR
(key) (Bold – Pole position awarded by qualifying time. Italics – Pole position earned by points standings or practice time. * – Most laps led.)

Monster Energy Cup Series

Daytona 500

Nationwide Series

Camping World Truck Series

 Season still in progress 
 Ineligible for series points

ARCA Menards Series
(key) (Bold – Pole position awarded by qualifying time. Italics – Pole position earned by points standings or practice time. * – Most laps led.)

ARCA Menards Series East

ARCA Menards Series West

References

External links
 
 
 
 

Living people
1976 births
Sportspeople from Riverside, California
Racing drivers from California
NASCAR drivers
Robert Yates Racing drivers
Joe Gibbs Racing drivers
Kyle Busch Motorsports drivers
Chip Ganassi Racing drivers